Trent Wotherspoon  is a Canadian politician and former interim leader of the Saskatchewan New Democratic Party (NDP). He was elected to represent the electoral district of Regina Rosemont in the Legislative Assembly of Saskatchewan in the 2007 election, and was re-elected in the 2011 election, and 2016 election. Wotherspoon was a candidate for the party's leadership in 2013. In 2016, the NDP caucus elected Wotherspoon to serve as Leader of the Opposition following the defeat of Cam Broten in the 2016 provincial election and the party's provincial council elected him interim leader.

Early life
Wotherspoon was born in Regina where he lives with his wife Stephanie, a school teacher. Wotherspoon went to university at the University of Regina where he completed a Bachelor of Education degree. While at university, Wotherspoon also took classes in business administration. He also ran a painting company to help cover tuition.

Wotherspoon worked with the Regina Public Schools system where he helped to develop a new adult campus.  He also helped implement a new holistic vocational adaptation program for students who displayed severe violent behaviours and lower cognitive abilities, and worked with the Ranch Ehrlo Society to provide addiction and behavioural treatment. Wotherspoon went on to create a youth justice program that helped high risk offenders. Also, he was a member of the Business Improvement District for the City of Regina's Warehouse District.

Political career
Wotherspoon was elected in November 2007 and over the term became the opposition critic for Finance, SaskPower and SaskEnergy, as well as Chair of the Public Accounts committee, and committee member for Crown and Central Agencies and Saskatchewan's Commonwealth Parliamentary Association. Following the 2011 election Wotherspoon continued on as the critic for Finance and SaskPower and became the new critic for Education.

2013 NDP leadership campaign
On September 14, 2012, Wotherspoon announced his candidacy for the leadership of the Saskatchewan NDP. He was one of three declared candidates including MLA Cam Broten and doctor Ryan Meili. A fourth candidate, economist Erin Weir, withdrew from the race before the leadership vote. At the leadership convention, Wotherspoon received the fewest votes on the first ballot and withdrew. Broten won on the second ballot by a narrow margin.

Interim leader
Wotherspoon was interim leader of the NDP, and leader of the opposition in the Saskatchewan legislature, from 2016 until June 2017 when he announced his resignation in order to consider seeking the permanent leadership of the party in the  March 3, 2018 leadership election. MLA Ryan Meili was elected party leader with 55% of the vote in March 2018. Wotherspoon was re-elected in the 2020 general election.

Electoral record

Overview

Provincial constituency elections

References

External links
 
 Leadership campaign website
 Sask NDP page 
 Trent Wotherspoon - Legislative Assembly of Saskatchewan

Saskatchewan New Democratic Party MLAs
Living people
1979 births
Politicians from Regina, Saskatchewan
University of Regina alumni
Leaders of the Saskatchewan CCF/NDP
21st-century Canadian politicians